Tabaninae is a subfamily in the family Tabanidae commonly known as horse flies . There are more than 3000 described species in Tabaninae.

Tribes and genera

Diachlorini

Acanthocera Macquart, 1834
Acellomyia Gonzalez, 1999
Anacimas Enderlein, 1923
Anaerythrops Barretto, 1948
Atelozella Bequaert, 1930
Atelozomyia Dias, 1987
Bartolomeudiasiella Dias, 1987
Bolbodimyia Bigot, 1892
Buestanmyia González, 2021
Catachlorops Lutz, 1909
Chalybosoma Oldroyd, 1949
Chasmia Enderlein, 1922
Chlorotabanus Lutz, 1909
Cretotabanus Fairchild, 1969
Cryptotylus Lutz, 1909
Cydistomorpha Trojan, 1994
Cydistomyia Taylor, 1919
Dasybasis Macquart, 1847
Dasychela Enderlein, 1922
Dasyrhamphis Enderlein, 1922
Diachlorus Osten Sacken, 1876
Dichelacera Macquart, 1838
Dicladocera Lutz, 1913
Elephantotus Gorayeb, 2014
Erioneura Barretto, 1951
Eristalotabanus Kröber, 1931
Eutabanus Kröber, 1930
Hemichrysops Kröber, 1930
Himantostylus Lutz, 1913
Holcopsis Enderlein, 1923
Japenoides Oldroyd, 1949
Lepiselaga Macquart, 1938
Leptapha Enderlein, 1923
Leucotabanus Lutz, 1913
Limata Oldroyd, 1954
Lissimas Enderlein, 1922
Microtabanus Fairchild, 1937
Montismyia González, 2017
Myiotabanus Lutz, 1928
Nanorrhynchus Olsoufiev, 1937
Neavella Oldroyd, 1954
Neobolbodimyia Ricardo, 1913
Oopelma Enderlein, 1923
Pachyschelomyia Barretto, 1951
Phaeotabanus Lutz, 1913
Philipomyia Olsufjev, 1964
Philipota Kapoor, 1991
Philipotabanus Fairchild, 1943
Pseudacanthocera Lutz, 1913
Rhabdotylus Lutz, 1909
Roquezia Wilkerson, 1985
Selasoma Macquart, 1838
Spilotabanus Fairchild, 1969
Stenotabanus Lutz, 1913
Stibasoma Schiner, 1867
Stonemyia Burger, 1985
Stypommisa Enderlein, 1923
Teskeyellus Philip & Fairchild, 1974

Haematopotini
Haematopota Meigen, 1803
Heptatoma Meigen, 1803
Hippocentrodes Philip, 1961
Hippocentrum Austen, 1908

Tabanini
Agkistrocerus Philip, 1941
Ancala Enderlein, 1922
Atylotus Osten Sacken, 1876
Dasyrhamphis Enderlein, 1922
Hamatabanus Philip, 1941
Hybomitra Enderlein, 1922
Poeciloderas Lutz, 1921
Tabanus Linnaeus, 1758
Therioplectes Zeller, 1842
Whitneyomyia Bequaert, 1933

References

Further reading

 
 
 

Tabanidae
Brachycera subfamilies